Reedley Hallows or Reedley is a civil parish in the Borough of Pendle in Lancashire, England.  It forms part of Burnley and Brierfield. It had a population of 1,994, reducing to 1,960 at the 2011 Census.

It is on the Leeds and Liverpool Canal, and the construction of a marina started in January 2008 and is expected to be completed in September.   The local railway station, Reedley Hallows Halt on the East Lancashire Line, closed in 1956.  The marina, and the site of the railway station, are both outside the current boundary of the parish, and are in an unparished area, which is part of the town of Burnley.

History
The civil parish was created in 1894 from the majority of Reedley Hallows, Filly Close and New Laund Booth civil parish. That civil parish had been created in 1866 from the township in the ancient parish of Whalley.

The original boundary with Burnley was Barden Clough, but as town expanded it was moved to the north-west.

Although administratively inside the parish of Whalley, as parts of the former royal hunting Forest of Pendle, the area was extra-parochial until 1887. As part of the Honour of Clitheroe, this meant the parish church for the area was the chapel at Clitheroe castle.

Reedley Hallows is the eastern side of Pendle Water, while New Laund Booth is to the north-west and Filly Close to the south-west. All 3 are originally documented as enclosures in the forest. In 1324 Filly Close was leased in connection with Royle, across Pendle Water in Burnley. In 1341, Reedley Hallows was a stock-farm for the vaccaries (mediaeval cattle farms) in the rest of Pendle Forest. By 1459 the New Laund (probably originally a deer park) had also been leased to farm.

From 1894 to 1974, Reedley was the administrative centre of the Burnley Rural District. The council offices where located in what is now the Oaks Hotel on Colne Road. There is also a Magistrates' court.

Notable people
John and Robert Nutter, Catholic martyrs executed for being priests in 1584 and 1600

Gallery

See also

Listed buildings in Reedley Hallows

References
Notes

Citations

Bibliography

External links

Map of Reedley Hallows current (2013) parish boundary at Lancashire County Council website
Reedley Hallows Township Boundaries - Reedley is marked as area 237
Reedley Hallows Parish Council
Lancashire Telegraph - Lucas Sports Fields
Burnley Express - Jewel Mill
Lancashire Telegraph - Belvedere and Calder Vale Sports Club
Burnley Express - Holme End
Briercliffe Society - Pendle bridge
Burnley Express - Oaks Hotel history

Civil parishes in Lancashire
Geography of the Borough of Pendle